Speiredonia simplex is a species of moth of the family Erebidae first described by Arthur Gardiner Butler in 1877. It is found on the Loyalty Islands, Vanuatu, Fiji and Tonga.

External links
 

Moths described in 1877
Speiredonia